John Martin Reservoir State Park is a state park in Colorado. It contains John Martin Reservoir, which is the second largest body of water in Colorado by capacity. It is also known for being a prime birdwatching location. Bent County, Colorado has been documented to have over 400 different species of birds.

Colorado Parks and Wildlife officials released thirty black-footed ferrets into a prairie dog colony in the nearby Southern Planes Preserve in 2022.

Climate

According to the Köppen Climate Classification system, John Martin Dam has a cold semi-arid climate, abbreviated "BSk" on climate maps. The  reading is the highest reliably measured temperature ever recorded in the state of Colorado.

References

Protected areas of Bent County, Colorado
State parks of Colorado
Protected areas established in 2001